
Gmina Jabłonka is a rural gmina (administrative district) in Nowy Targ County, Lesser Poland Voivodeship, in southern Poland, on the Slovak border.

Villages
Gmina Jabłonka contains the villages and settlements of Chyżne, Jabłonka, Jabłonka-Bory, Lipnica Mała, Orawka, Danielki, Podwilk, Zubrzyca Dolna and Zubrzyca Górna.

Neighbouring gminas
Gmina Jabłonka is bordered by the gminas of Bystra-Sidzina, Czarny Dunajec, Lipnica Wielka, Raba Wyżna, Spytkowice and Zawoja. It also borders Slovakia.

References
Polish official population figures 2006

Jablonka
Nowy Targ County